Adelaide Andrejewa von Skilondz (also Andrejewa de Skilondz;  – 5 April 1969) was a Russian operatic coloratura soprano. She was born in Saint Petersburg, where she studied singing and began her career in 1904. In 1909 she sang the role of the Queen of Shemakha in the Saint Petersburg premiere of Nikolai Rimsky-Korsakov's opera The Golden Cockerel. She also sang at the Berlin Hofoper until the start of World War I, at which time she moved to Stockholm, where she performed in opera up until 1920 and in concert performances until 1930. Her roles there included the Queen of the Night in Mozart's The Magic Flute, the title role in Donizetti's Lucia di Lammermoor, and Gilda in Verdi's Rigoletto. Later she taught singing. Among her students were Kerstin Meyer, Kim Borg, Eva Gustavson, Eva Prytz, and Elisabeth Söderström. She died in Stockholm at the age of 87.

References

Further reading
 

1882 births
1969 deaths
Operatic sopranos from the Russian Empire
Voice teachers

Singers from Saint Petersburg
Women music educators
Emigrants from the Russian Empire to Sweden